Brunei is a sovereign state located on the north coast of the island of Borneo in Southeast Asia. Apart from its coastline with the South China Sea, the country is surrounded by the state of Sarawak, Malaysia. Economic growth during the 1990s and 2000s, with the GDP increasing 56% from 1999 to 2008, transformed Brunei into an industrialised country. It has developed wealth from extensive petroleum and natural gas fields. Brunei has the second-highest Human Development Index among the Southeast Asian nations, after Singapore, and is classified as a "developed country". According to the International Monetary Fund (IMF), Brunei is ranked fifth in the world by gross domestic product per capita at purchasing power parity. The IMF estimated, in 2011, that Brunei was one of two countries (the other being Libya) with a public debt at 0% of the national GDP. Forbes also ranks Brunei as the fifth-richest nation out of 182, based on its petroleum and natural gas fields.

With the recent weakening of the country's economy due to pressure on oil prices, Brunei has adopted hardline sharia law to try to gain local public support. In 2019, the country issued a new law making homosexuality and adultery punishable by stoning to death, even for foreigners or non-Muslims  leading to a boycott of Brunei-related businesses primarily targeting hotels owned by the Sultan of Brunei and Royal Brunei Airlines.

Notable firms 
This list includes notable companies with primary headquarters located in the country. The industry and sector follow the Industry Classification Benchmark taxonomy. Organizations which have ceased operations are included and noted as defunct.

References 

Brunei